Harry Valérien (4 November 1923 in Munich –  12 October 2012 in Berg) was a German sports journalist.

Life 
Valérien was the first sport presenter for the television show das aktuelle sportstudio on German broadcaster ZDF. For forty years he covered the Olympic Games in Germany. His sport topics were swimming, golf and winter sports. Valérien was married and had two daughters.

Works 

 (together with Christian Zentner): Olympia ’68: Südwest Verlag, Munich (1968)
 (together with Christian Zentner): Fußball ’70: Südwest Verlag, Munich (1970)
 Olympia München 1972. München, Kiel, Sapporo: Südwest Verlag, Munich (1982)
 Fußball 74 – Weltmeisterschaft: Südwest Verlag, Munich (1974)
 (together with Christian Zentner): Olympia 1976. Montreal, Innsbruck: Südwest Verlag, Munich (1985)
 Fußball 78 – Weltmeisterschaft Argentinien: Südwest Verlag, Munich (1978)
 Fußball ’80 – Europameisterschaft, Europapokale, Bundesliga: Südwest Verlag, Munich (1980)
 Olympia ’80. Moskau und Lake Placid: Südwest Verlag, Munich (1982)
 (together with Christian Zentner): Fußball ’82. XII. Weltmeisterschaft vom 13. Juni bis 11. Juli 1982 in Spanien: Südwest Verlag, Munich (1984)
 (together with Christian Zentner): Fußball ’84. V. Europameisterschaft vom 12. bis 27. Juni 1984 in Frankreich. Bundesliga-Pokale: Südwest Verlag, Munich (1986)
 (together with Christian Zentner): Olympia ’84. Los Angeles, Sarajevo: Südwest Verlag, Munich (1986)
 Harry Valériens Sport-Reporte. Bilder, Ereignisse, Dokumente: Südwest Verlag, Munich (1985)
 Fußball ’86. Weltmeisterschaft in Mexiko, (1986)
 (together with Christian Zentner): Fußball-EM ’88 Deutschland. VIII. Fußball-Europameisterschaft von 10. bis 25. Juni 1988: Südwest Verlag, Munich (1988)
 (together with Christian Zentner): Olympia 1988. Seoul, Calgary: Südwest Verlag, Munich (1988)
 Golf, Faszination eines Weltsports: Südwest Verlag, Munich (1989)
 (together with Christian Zentner): Fußball-WM '90 Italien: Südwest Verlag, Munich (1990)
 Olympia '92. Die Winterspiele Albertville: Südwest Verlag, Munich (1992)
 Lillehammer '94. Das Olympiabuch: Sportverlag, Berlin (1994)
 USA '94: Sportverlag, Berlin (1994)
 Atlanta. Das Olympiabuch 1996: Sportverlag, Berlin (1996)

Awards 
 1965, 1976 and 1988: Goldene Kamera
 1972, 1979 and 1990: Goldener Bambi
 1981: Goldener Gong
 1988: Telestar
 2004: Bayerischer Fernsehpreis

External links 
 spiegel.de:Harry Valérien an Herzversagen gestorben

References 

German sports journalists
German sports broadcasters
German male journalists
German television presenters
Journalists from Munich
1923 births
2012 deaths
ZDF people